The Mecklenburg-Western Pomerania Football Association (LFVMV), is the umbrella organization of the football clubs in the German state Mecklenburg-Western Pomerania and covers the football districts of Mecklenburg Lake District, Vorpommern-Rügen, Schwerin – Nordwestmecklenburg, Western Pomerania – Greifswald, Warnow and West Mecklenburg. The LFVMV was founded in 1990 and has its headquarters in Rostock. President of the association is Joachim Masuch.

The LFV belongs to the Northeastern German Football Association and is one of 21 state organizations of the German Football Association (German: Deutscher Fussball-Bund - DFB).

In 2017, the LFV had 58,949 members from 469 football clubs with 1,923 teams.

References

External links
 LFV website 

Football in Mecklenburg-Western Pomerania
Football governing bodies in Germany
1990 establishments in Germany